Mark Stephen Anthony Yeates (born 11 January 1985) is an Irish professional football coach and former player who played as a winger.

Yeates began his career with Tottenham Hotspur but failed to make the transition to the first team, spending time on loan at Brighton & Hove Albion, Swindon Town, Colchester United, Hull City and Leicester City. On leaving Spurs he returned on a permanent deal to Colchester before spells with Middlesbrough, Sheffield United, Watford, Bradford City, Oldham Athletic, Blackpool and Notts County. He has three under-21 caps for the Republic of Ireland.

Playing career

Tottenham Hotspur
Yeates started his career at Tottenham Hotspur, but first played professional football in loan spells with Brighton & Hove Albion and Swindon Town during the 2003–04 season. Loaned to Swindon as part of the transfer to Spurs of Swindon player Leigh Mills, Yeates only played four games before being returned to White Hart Lane after a disagreement with then manager Andy King. He made his Spurs debut against Wolves on the final day of the 2003–04 Premier League season, setting up a goal for Robbie Keane. He made three first team appearances for Spurs.

During the 2005–06 season, Yeates played on long-term loan at Colchester United, scoring five league goals, as they achieved promotion from League One.

Prior to 2006–07 Yeates signed a two-year contract extension with Spurs. He joined Championship team Hull City on a season-long loan, but hardly featured for them before returning to his parent club midway through the season.

He then signed a loan contract until the end of the 2006–07 season with another Championship side, Leicester City. He scored on his Leicester début at the Walkers Stadium in a 1–1 draw with Luton Town. On 25 April 2007, having only featured 16 times for Leicester, and not once under caretaker manager Nigel Worthington, he was allowed to return to Spurs after being deemed surplus to requirements.

Colchester United
On 3 July 2007 he completed a permanent move to Colchester United. Yeates was set to sign for Crystal Palace Football Club, but due to the fact that he failed his medical, the transfer was abandoned. He had a productive year in League One, during which time, he scored the first competitive goal at the new Colchester Community Stadium in a game against Oldham.

Middlesbrough
Yeates then signed for newly relegated Championship team Middlesbrough for £500,000 on 26 June 2009. He made his début for Middlesbrough on 7 August 2009 in a 0–0 draw with Sheffield United. In and out of the team in the first part of the season, he scored what turned out to be his only goal for Middlesbrough in their 5–1 win over QPR in December 2009.

Sheffield United
After finding himself surplus to requirements under new boss Gordon Strachan, Yeates signed for Boro's Championship rivals Sheffield United. He scored his first goal for Sheffield United in a 2–1 defeat at Preston North End on 9 February 2010. Having made the move, Yeates found himself playing no more regularly at Bramall Lane than at Middlesbrough. In an eighteen-month stay, he was in and out of the side and never showed any real consistency. By the time Micky Adams took over as manager of the Blades, Yeates was virtually frozen out of the first team altogether.

Watford
In July 2011, Yeates signed for Watford on a two-year deal for an undisclosed fee. He scored on his debut against Burnley to put Watford 2–0 up, with the game finishing 2–2. Yeates was a regular in the Watford side up until their FA Cup clash against Tottenham Hotspur on 27 January, in which he lost his place to Sean Murray. However, he continued to make substitute appearances and retained his place in the squad the following season under then-new manager, Gianfranco Zola. During this period, Yeates was primarily played in a central role rather than his usual wide position, with Yeates stating that he actually preferred this new position

On 7 June 2013, Watford announced that Yeates' contract would not be renewed and he was to be released as a free agent.

Bradford City
On 3 July 2013, Yeates signed a two-year contract with Bradford City, the third time that Yeates had worked under manager Phil Parkinson, having previously played under him at Hull City and Colchester United. Yeates made his Bradford debut on 3 August, the opening day of the season, playing 66 minutes of a 2–2 draw against Bristol City. and scored his first goal for the club during his second appearance, in a 4–0 win against Carlisle United. On 26 November, Yeates came off the bench to score his second goal for the club in a 1–1 draw against Notts County.

Oldham Athletic
On 25 August 2015, Yeates joined Oldham Athletic on a short-term deal. Yeates scored one goal in 20 games for the club.

Blackpool
On 7 January 2016, Yeates joined Blackpool on an initial 18-month deal from Oldham Athletic with the option for a further year.

Notts County
On 30 January 2017, Yeates signed for Notts County.

Eastleigh
On 28 June 2017, Yeates joined National League side Eastleigh on a two-year deal.

AFC Fylde
Yeates left Eastleigh to join AFC Fylde on 12 June 2019.

Bamber Bridge
Yeates joined Bamber Bridge F.C. from AFC Fylde in September 2020.

Coaching career
Yeates joined the academy coaching staff at Fleetwood Town, working with the under-13s. He was appointed to a full-time role within the academy in September 2021. He became the under-18s assistant coach in July 2022, before becoming head coach of the under-18s in January 2023, guiding the team to the fifth round of the 2022–23 FA Youth Cup.

Personal life
His late father Stephen played for Shelbourne, Shamock Rovers (two goals in 11 appearances in 1989–90), Athlone Town and Kilkenny City.

Career statistics

Honours
Colchester United
 Football League One: runner-up 2005–06

References

External links

1985 births
Living people
Association footballers from County Dublin
Republic of Ireland association footballers
Republic of Ireland under-21 international footballers
Republic of Ireland B international footballers
Association football wingers
Premier League players
English Football League players
Tottenham Hotspur F.C. players
Brighton & Hove Albion F.C. players
Swindon Town F.C. players
Colchester United F.C. players
Hull City A.F.C. players
Leicester City F.C. players
Middlesbrough F.C. players
Sheffield United F.C. players
Watford F.C. players
Bradford City A.F.C. players
Oldham Athletic A.F.C. players
Blackpool F.C. players
Notts County F.C. players
Eastleigh F.C. players
AFC Fylde players
Bamber Bridge F.C. players
National League (English football) players
Northern Premier League players